Princess Maximiliana Maria of Bavaria (4 July 1552 – 11 July 1614) was a Bavarian princess.

Biography 
Maximiliana was born on 4 July 1552 in Munich. She was the youngest daughter of Albert V, Duke of Bavaria and his wife Archduchess Anna of Austria, a daughter of Ferdinand I, Holy Roman Emperor. She was educated in music and trained under Hans Schachinger. As an appreciator of music, she became close with the family of Orlande de Lassus.

Maximiliana never married and lived at the court of her brother William V, Duke of Bavaria. William V provided for her care, granting her an annual allowance of 6,000 guilders. She and her sister Maria Anna, the consort of Charles II, orchestrated the marriage of their niece, Maria Anna, with Ferdinand, Archduke of Inner Austria. She lived for three years in Austria with her sister before returning to Munich in 1598.

She died on 11 July 1614 and was buried at the Cathedral of Our Dear Lady in Munich.

References 

1552 births
1614 deaths
Bavarian princesses
Burials at Munich Frauenkirche
House of Wittelsbach
Nobility from Munich
Daughters of monarchs